The 2005 Skyrunner World Series was the 4th edition of the global skyrunning competition, Skyrunner World Series, organised by the International Skyrunning Federation from 2002.

Results
The World Cup has developed in 7 races from May to October.

References

External links
 Skyrunner World Series

2005